Jesús Segovia Pérez (born 16 June 1989), better known by his stage name Xuso Jones, is a Spanish singer and composer.

Biography 

He became popular through social media doing covers to other artists and sharing original songs. He recorded a video of himself singing his order from the car in the drive-through of a McDonald's restaurant. The video became a viral hit on YouTube, and the company hired him for a Big Mac spot.

After this he went to Los Angeles where he recorded three singles and a music video. "Buy the DJ a round" took him to the number 5 on iTunes Spain. "Celebrating Life" was the second single (he would include them both on Part 1, his first studio album). He was nominated for Best Spanish New Artist on the 2012 edition of Los Premios 40 Principales, losing out to Auryn.

Xuso served as the warm-up act for Justin Bieber and Selena Gomez in Spain. In 2013-2014, he participated in the third season of Spanish TV show Tu cara me suena imitating Shawn Mendes, where famous artists have to impersonate iconic singers on stage.

On 19 May 2015, Xuso released his second studio album, Vuela.

On 29 December 2015, Xuso was announced as one of the six candidates to represent Spain in the Eurovision Song Contest 2016. He took part in the televised national final organised by TVE with "Victorious", a song composed by Andreas Öhrn, Peter Boström and Chris Wahle. He came 2nd with 94 points, 20 from winning and going to Eurovision.

In September 2018 he participated in the cooking show MasterChef Celebrity. He was the second contestant to be eliminated.

Discography

Albums

Singles

Soundtracks

Awards 
 Los Premios 40 Principales 2012 - Nominated for Best Spanish New Artist
 Nickelodeon Kids' Choice Awards 2014 - Nominated for Best Spanish Artist

References

External links 
 
 

Musicians from the Region of Murcia
People from Murcia
Living people
1989 births
21st-century Spanish singers
21st-century Spanish male singers